Sama Al-Awael School (SAS) (Arabic : مدرسة سما الاوائل) is a private educational institution located in As Salt, Jordan. It was established in 2008 and included only middle and Secondary Grades. The school in 2012 has relocated and expanded and now includes all 12 grades plus a kindergarten (KG) for pre-education. 

SAS only offers the Jordanian high school program (Tawjihi)  .

Elementary and primary schools in Jordan
Private schools in Jordan
High schools and secondary schools in Jordan
Jordan